The New Zealand Flying School was formed in 1915, by the Walsh Brothers, Leo and Vivian, to train pilots for the Royal Flying Corps. The school flew a fleet of home-built and imported flying boats from Mission Bay on Auckland's Waitemata Harbour, near where a sculpture  now stands to commemorate the Walsh brothers. Over 100 pilots trained at the school, most of them going on to serve in the First World War, including ace Keith Caldwell.

The flying school was sold to the New Zealand Government in 1924 after struggling to survive after the end of the war.

History 

The flying school first began operating from a shed in Ōrākei, taking the first three pupils on 2 October 1915. On 28 November 1915, the school moved to Mission Bay, and for many years operated adjacent to the Melanesian Mission. The first regular student intake was in 1916. Between 1915 and when the school closed in September 1924, over 1,000 pilots had been trained.

Aircraft

 Avro 504 K & L
 Boeing Model 1 - 2 planes acquired in 1919; first product for Boeing
 Curtiss Model F
 Airco DH.6 - one example, damaged by gale August 1920 and not repaired
 Supermarine Channel I
 Walsh Brothers Flying Boats

On film
A 1993 documentary Wings on the Waitemata  includes historical footage of the Walsh brothers' flying school.

See also
 George Bolt
 Keith Caldwell
 Henry Wigram  
 Vivian Walsh (aviator)
 Walsh Brothers Flying Boats

References

 Includes good photographs
 1966 Encyclopedia entry
 http://uneli.unitec.ac.nz/our_auckland/kohi/flight%20school.htm
 http://www.cambridgeairforce.org.nz/Walsh%20Bros%20Avro.htm
 http://www.raes.org.nz/index.cfm/NZAT/Vivian_and_Leo_Walsh
 http://www.teara.govt.nz/EarthSeaAndSky/SeaAndAirTransport/Aviation/3/en
 http://www.dnzb.govt.nz/dnzb/default.asp?Find_Quick.asp?PersonEssay=3W3
 http://www.auckland-airport.co.nz/NewsHistory/aviators.php?walsh

Aviation in New Zealand
Transport buildings and structures in the Auckland Region
Waitematā Harbour